Alex Tyrrell (born 23 March 1988) is a Canadian politician who has served as the leader of the Green Party of Quebec since 2013.

Early life and education
Born in 1988, Tyrrell grew up in Beaconsfield on the West Island of Montreal.

Following his secondary education, Tyrrell enrolled in the Mechanical Engineering Technology program at Montreal's Dawson College. During his technical studies at the CEGEP, he worked on the issues of biofuels and became involved in an advocacy campaign to finance a project of design of electric vehicles for the students of his department.

In 2011, Tyrrell enrolled in an environmental science program at Concordia University in Montreal, focusing his studies to better understand the problems of pollution, the impacts of climate change, and issues related to the environment. During the course of his degree, Tyrrell studied the negative environmental impact of mining and resource extraction in Quebec. He graduated in June 2017.

Social activism
In spring 2012, Tyrrell was actively involved in the Maple Spring student protests.

Later in 2012, Tyrrell actively participated in the Indigenous-rights 'Idle No More' demonstrations in Montreal, meeting movement leader Raymond Robinson. During Robinson's hunger strikes, he and Tyrrell developed a friendship, leading to Tyrrell, in April 2013, being named communications officer for the project. Tyrrell participated in meetings with the Chief of The First Nations Assembly and the Minister of Aboriginal Affairs.

Tyrrell's involvement with Idle No More led to his participation in Indigenous-led protests against shale gas exploration in New Brunswick.

Federal politics
Tyrrell became involved in politics in 2006 with the New Democratic Party during the early years of Jack Layton's leadership.

During his involvement with the New Democrats, Tyrrell held several positions on the Executive Committee of the riding of Lac St-Louis and participated in the 2008 and 2011 election campaigns, serving as the chief organizer for the NDP campaign in this constituency and, subsequently, as president of the local association. Following the campaign, he volunteered with Pierrefonds-Dollard MP Lysane Blanchette-Lamothe.

During the 2011-2012 NDP leadership race, he supported the candidacy of Nathan Cullen, becoming the co-organizer of his campaign in Quebec. Following the victory of Thomas Mulcair, Tyrrell stepped back from the federal political scene and turned his commitment to the student movement.

Tyrrell had been mulling a run for the leadership of the federal Green Party after Elizabeth May gave mixed comments about whether or not she would resign the leadership after the election. May subsequently resigned on 4 November 2019, triggering a leadership election. He declared his candidacy on 15 January 2020, but suspended his campaign on 3 June 2020.

On March 4, 2022, eight days after Russia began an invasion of Ukraine, Tyrrell published a thread on Twitter suggesting that Russia's demands regarding Ukraine were reasonable. He added that while he was against the violence, he felt that Ukraine should not be supplied with weapons and materials, but should instead engage in negotiations with Russia and consider their demands. His comments were immediately met with fierce criticism. Bernard Drainville, former member of the National Assembly of Quebec, accused Tyrell of "adopting Putin’s rhetoric... and being his accomplice", while CAQ Deputy Christopher Skeete noted this was a "horrible insult to the Jewish community". Quebec politician Benoit Charette called on Tyrell to apologize immediately to both the Ukrainian & Jewish community. His comments were denounced by the leadership of both the Ontario and Federal Green Parties, with the latter designating his views as "abhorrent". Tyrrell later conducted an interview with Toronto-based radio station CFRB, during which he acknowledged the widespread criticism of his position. Alex Tyrrell argues that activism for peace was always carried by the left and the Green Party both in Canada and in Quebec and his position reflects that.

In July 2022, Tyrrell was expelled from the federal Green Party while preparing to launch a leadership bid, in part due to the controversy surrounding his comments about the war in Ukraine. He is currently appealing the decision

Green Party of Quebec
Following the student protests of 2012, Tyrrell became interested in provincial politics, becoming involved with the Green Party of Quebec by submitting his candidacy in the riding of Jacques-Cartier.

During the 2014 campaign, Tyrrell finished in third in the riding of Notre-Dame-de-Grâce with 4.5% of the vote, earning the second highest number of votes for a Green candidate in that election.

Party leader (2013–present)
Following the party's sagging fortunes in the 2012 campaign, including a public incident in which a journalist with the newspaper La Presse was able to secure candidacy with the party without vetting, incumbent Green Party leader Claude Sabourin resigned. Tyrrell was the first candidate to declare his intention to seek the leadership of the party.

Tyrrell campaigned on the slogan "Uniting the PVQ", a direct reference to the internal divisions that he saw as preventing the party from advancing in Quebec politics. He proposed to unite the party around progressive values, to modernize the program, and to return the party clearly to the left of the provincial scene. Tyrrell proposed to broaden the party's environment-oriented agenda to present a more comprehensive platform that called for massive investments in public services such as health and education.

On 21 September 2013, Tyrrell won the leadership of the party, beating Sainte-Justine-de-Newton mayor Patricia Domingos, former Action démocratique du Québec candidate Marc-André Beauchemin, and party activist Pierre Étienne Loignon.
   
Soon after assuming the leadership of the party, Tyrrell was faced with opposition from the party's executive. Tyrrell summarily dismissed the executive on 3 December 2013, an act which dismissed members said violated the party's statutes and regulations.

Following the calming of internal tensions, Tyrrell participated in the adopted a new political program for the party that addressed environmental issues, recognized social struggles, and adopted an eco-socialist position for the 2014 general election.

Soon after his election as leader, Tyrrell faced off against newly elected Liberal leader Philippe Couillard in a by-election held in Outremont.

By positioning the Quebec Green Party on the left of the political spectrum, Tyrrell and federal Green Party leader Elizabeth May had a public falling out, with leaked emails indicating May had said to federal members: "Please, as a federal Green, do nothing to associate yourself with Alex [Tyrrell, leader of the Quebec Green Party]." May's positions on issues such as the federal Green Party's support for the BDS movement led to Tyrrell labeling May's leadership as "detrimental" to the green movement in Canada.

During the 2017 by-election in the riding of Gouin, Tyrrell announced he would be seeking the seat, and positioned the Green Party of Quebec as a progressive federalist political party.

Tyrrell again contested a by-election in 2017, seeking the seat of Louis-Hébert, left vacant after the resignation of Employment Minister Sam Hamad.

Tyrrell again contested the 2018 provincial election and a by-election in 2018.

Electoral results

References

1988 births
Activists from Montreal
Canadian activists
Canadian environmentalists
Canadian feminists
Canadian social democrats
Canadian socialists
Concordia University alumni
Ecofeminists
Leaders of the Green Party of Quebec
Living people
Politicians from Montreal
21st-century Canadian politicians